Telex from Cuba is the 2008 debut novel by writer Rachel Kushner. The novel follows a group of anglo-expatriates living in Cuba during the Cuban revolution and was loosely based on Kushner's mother's experience growing up in Cuba on territory occupied by the United Fruit Company.

Plot
Set in Cuba during Fulgencio Batista's reign as dictator, the novel follows the intersecting lives of several families of white American expatriates, the men of which work for the United Fruit Company. Several Americans who, back home, would have been of different classes and never mixed, become close while living in Cuba. K.C. Stites, the son of the CEO, with the encouragement of his mother, grows close with Everly Lederer, the daughter of a man who was considered weak and ineffectual back home. His best friend is from the Allain family whom the Stites consider hillbillys and who is rumoured to have killed a man back in America. The Carringtons are a couple who lived in Latin America for most of their lives and have a bitter acerbic marriage. Tip Carrington regularly cheats on his wife, and Mrs. Carrington has turned to alcohol in order to help.

In 1958, the rebel forces begin to grow stronger and gain sympathy from several of the children of the white ex-patriates. K.C's older brother Del runs off to join the rebels and helps to organize attacks against his father. After a bomb goes off in the United Fruit Company's prestigious club, the white Americans are forced to evacuate by their government.

Characters
 K.C. Stites, a young boy whose father works for the United Fruit Company and whose older brother Del runs off to join Fidel Castro and his rebel army.
 Everly Lederer, a shy young girl with coke-bottle glasses who thinks that life in Cuba will be like the novel Treasure Island.
 Rachel K., a young woman of vague European extraction who pretends to be from France and dances a burlesque. She is close to several of the overthrown presidents.
 La Mazière, a former Nazi officer who helps to supply arms to the differing warring factions in Cuba and eventually joins the rebels in the mountains helping to train them in the art of war.

Reception
The novel received positive reviews upon its release. A review for The New York Times called the style of the novel "sure and sharp, studded with illuminating images." The Guardian dubbed it "an epic and enjoyable look at wealth tainted by loss in expatriate Cuba."

Adaptation
Paramount Television and Anonymous Content are producing a series based on the novel. The adaptation is by Phyllis Nagy and she will serve as showrunner and executive producer. Rosalie Swedlin and Adam Shulman of Anonymous Content are also executive producing the series.

References

2008 American novels
Novels set in Cuba
2008 debut novels